Paul Lamb may refer to:
 Paul Lamb (footballer) (born 1974), English footballer
 Paul Lamb (musician) (born 1955), British blues harmonica player and bandleader
 Paul Lamb (politician) (1901-1986), Kansas state senator